Tomas Christiansen (born 12 November 1969), better known by his stage name Tomas N'evergreen, is a Danish-Russian pop singer. The singles "Since You've Been Gone" and "Everytime (I See Your Smile)" were on top ten lists throughout Russia and Eastern Europe for more than a year and are still staples on FM radio.

His debut album Since You've Been Gone topped the charts in Russia and sold hundreds of thousands of units. The music video Since You've Been Gone was made with the participation of Russian singer Polina Griffith. He lives now in Moscow, Russia. Tomas has been married to Russian actress Valeriya Zhidkova since 24 September 2015.

Discography

Albums

In a Moment Like This
(My Way Music) Release date: 21 May 2010, With Christina Chanée

Soundtracks
Soundtracks containing Tomas N'evergreen songs:
 Humørkortstativsælgerens søn (Edel-Mega EMR 014159-2, 2002)
 All inclusive, или Всё включено! (Paradise, 2012)
 All inclusive 2 (Paradise, 2013)
 Lyubov-morkov (Real Dakota, 2008)

Compilations
 N'evergreen appears on the compilation album Мой HiT #1.

Videography

Music videos have been made for:

 Every Time (I See Your Smile) (2000)
 Since You've Been Gone (2003)
 Just Another Love Song (2004)
 She Believes in Gold (2005)
 I Play for You (2007)
 In a Moment Like This (2010)
 Taina Bez Tain (Something About Secrets) (with Kristina Orbakaite) (2011)
 Ay Ay Ay (with Leonid Agutin) (2012)
 Falling for You (with A-Studio) (2014)
 Pick Up the Phone (2016)
 We Go Back (2021)

References

External links

1969 births
Living people
Danish pop singers
Russian pop singers
Eurovision Song Contest entrants of 2010
Eurovision Song Contest entrants for Denmark
Dansk Melodi Grand Prix contestants
Dansk Melodi Grand Prix winners
People from Aarhus
Danish emigrants to Russia
Russian people of Danish descent